William Fife Jr. (1857–1944), also known as William Fife III, was the third generation of a family of Scottish yacht designers and builders.

William Fife  may also refer to:

 William Paul Fife (1917–2008), American hyperbaric medicine specialist
 William N. Fife (1831–1915), American architect (father of William W. Fife)
 William W. Fife (1857–1897), American architect (son of William N. Fife)

See also

 William Fyfe (disambiguation)
 William Fyffe (disambiguation)